James Hugh Paul (10 February 1888 – 27 February 1937) was an Argentine first-class cricketer.

Though born in Argentina, his family moved to England where he was educated at Malvern College. Returning to Argentina, he later made his debut in first-class cricket for Argentina against the touring Marylebone Cricket Club at Buenos Aires in 1926. He played a further first-class match for Argentina against a touring Sir J. Cahn's XI in 1930, before touring England with the South American cricket team in 1932, making five first-class appearances on the tour. He later played two first-class matches in England for H. D. G. Leveson Gower's XI against Oxford University at Eastbourne in 1935 and 1937. In nine first-class matches, Paul scored 272 run at an average of 18.13, with a high score of 39. With the ball he took 9 wickets with best figures of 2 for 23. He died in England at Earlswood in February 1937.

References

External links

1888 births
1937 deaths
People educated at Malvern College
Argentine cricketers
South Americans cricketers
H. D. G. Leveson Gower's XI cricketers